Grumpy Christmas is a 2021 Mexican comedy film directed by Raúl Martínez and starring Renata Notni, Angélica María and Alex Rose Wiesel. It was released on Netflix on December 21, 2021. It is a sequel to the 2016 theatrical film Un padre no tan padre.

Cast 
 Renata Notni		
 Angélica María
 Alex Rose Wiesel as Gala (voice)
 Héctor Bonilla as Don Servando
 Jacqueline Bracamontes as Alma
 Juan Pablo de Santiago	
 Tina Romero		
 Benny Ibarra as Fran
 Eduardo Tanus as Memo
 Natália Subtil as Gio
 Tina French as Gina
 Yulian Diaz as Joao

References

External links
 
 

2021 films
Mexican comedy films
2020s Spanish-language films
Spanish-language Netflix original films
Mexican Christmas films
Mexican sequel films